Edyth Shipton Goodall (20 February 1886 – 22 July 1929), professionally known as Edyth Goodall, was a Scottish actress. She was born in Dundee, the daughter of A. E. E. Goodall and his wife Annie, née Shipton.

She made her professional stage debut in 1904 and made her first London appearance in 1907. The Era said of her performance in the latter, "Good as her past record is, Miss Edyth Goodall has never done anything equal to her portrayal of this far-sighted, managing, strong-willed, good-hearted daughter of Lancashire".

When Daisy Ashford's The Young Visiters was adapted for the stage in 1920 she played the central role of Ethel Monticue.

Goodall married Leonard Francis Schuster in 1915. They had one child, a son born in 1921. Goodall died in London on 22 July 1929, aged 47.

References and sources

References

Sources
 

1886 births
1929 deaths
Actresses from Dundee
Scottish actresses